Another Mother's Son is a 2017 British war drama film directed by Christopher Menaul, written by Jenny Lecoat, and starring Jenny Seagrove, Julian Kostov, Ronan Keating, John Hannah, and Amanda Abbington.

The film is based on a true story from the German occupation of the Channel Islands, about a Jersey woman named Louisa Gould (played by Seagrove), who takes in an escaped young Russian war prisoner (played by Kostov).

Premise 
Louisa Gould (Jenny Seagrove) hides an escaped young Russian war prisoner, Feodor Burriy (Julian Kostov), from the German forces during World War II, assisted by her sister Ivy Forster (Amanda Abbington) and her brother Harold Le Druillenec (Ronan Keating).

Cast 
 Jenny Seagrove as Louisa Gould
 Julian Kostov as Feodor "Bill" Burriy
 Ronan Keating as Harold Le Druillenec
 John Hannah as Arthur Forster
 Amanda Abbington as Ivy Forster
 Brenock O'Connor as Rex Forster
 Peter Wight as René Le Mottée
 Susan Hampshire as Elena Le Fevre
 Félicité Du Jeu as Nicole
 Gwen Taylor as Lily Vibert
 Joanna David as Maud Vibert

Production 
Christopher Menaul directed the film based on the script by Jenny Lecoat, Louisa Gould's great-niece. Bill Kenwright's Bill Kenwright Films produced the film with Daniel-Konrad Cooper.

Principal photography on the film began on 9 November 2015 in Bath, Somerset. Filming also took place at the town's historic building Guildhall and West London Film Studios.

Release
The World Premiere Charity Gala was held in London at the Odeon Leicester Square on 16 March 2017.

Critical reception
On review aggregator website Rotten Tomatoes, the film has an approval rating of 50% based on 16 reviews, and an average rating of 5.5/10. On Metacritic, the film has a weighted average score of 50 out of 100, based on 4 critics, indicating "mixed or average reviews".

References

External links 
 

2017 films
British war drama films
2017 war drama films
Films shot in England
Films set on islands
Films set in the Channel Islands
Films set in the 1940s
Drama films based on actual events
Vertigo Films films
World War II films based on actual events
Films directed by Christopher Menaul
2017 drama films
British World War II films
Films scored by Mario Grigorov
2010s English-language films
2010s British films